The Michigan general election, 2018 was held on Tuesday, November 6, 2018 throughout Michigan. The Democrats swept all of the statewide offices held by the Republicans.

Federal

Congress

Senate

Incumbent Democratic Senator Debbie Stabenow won re-election to a fourth term.

House of Representatives

Democrats gained two House seats in the United States House of Representatives giving Michigan's House delegation an even split with seven Democrats and seven Republicans.

State

Executive

Governor and Lieutenant Governor

The Democratic ticket of Gretchen Whitmer and Garlin Gilchrist won the races for governor and lieutenant governor.  This is a Democratic gain.

Secretary of State

Former Wayne State University Law School Dean Jocelyn Benson was elected secretary of state which was a Democratic gain.  She became the first Democratic Michigan Secretary of State since 1995.

Attorney General

Detroit-based attorney Dana Nessel was elected Michigan attorney general becoming the first Democratic attorney general in 16 years.

State Board of Education

Legislature

Senate

All 38 seats in the Michigan Senate were up for election in 2018.  Democrats gained five seats, but Republicans still control 22 seats in the Michigan Senate.

House of Representatives

All 110 seats in the Michigan House of Representatives were up for election in 2018.  Democrats gained five seats, but Republicans still control the Michigan House with 58 Republicans and 52 Democrats.

Judiciary

Supreme Court

Two seats on the Michigan Supreme Court were up for election in 2018.  Justice Kurt Wilder, who was appointed by Governor Snyder to replace retiring Justice Robert P. Young Jr., and Justice Beth Clement, who was named by Governor Snyder to replace Justice Joan Larsen after the latter was confirmed to a seat on the U.S. 6th Circuit Court of Appeals in November, 2017, are each eligible to run for re-election. The two winners of the election were Clement and Megan Cavanagh, who unseated Wilder.

Candidates
Samuel Bagenstos (Democratic), law professor at University of Michigan
Megan Cavanagh (Democratic), appellate lawyer at Garan Lucow Miller P.C
Elizabeth Clement (Republican), incumbent Associate Justice of the Supreme Court of Michigan
Doug Dern (Natural Law), private law practice owner
Kerry Lee Morgan (Libertarian), counsel at Pentiuk, Couvreur & Kobiljak, P.C.
Kurtis Wilder (Republican), incumbent Associate Justice of the Supreme Court of Michigan

Results

Court of Appeals

District 1 (six-year term - 2 positions)

District 1 (partial term ending 1/1/2023)

District 2 (six-year term - 3 positions)

District 2 (partial term ending 1/1/2021)

District 3 (six-year term - 2 positions)

District 4 (six-year term)

District 4 (partial term ending 1/1/2023)

Ballot initiatives

Proposal 1

Proposal 1, an initiative to legalize cannabis, was approved 56-44.

Proposal 2

Proposal 2 was an initiative to transfer the power to draw state Legislative districts and US Congressional districts from the state legislature to an independent redistricting commission. The proposal passed 61-39.

Proposal 3

Proposal 3, an initiative to add voting policies such as same-day registration and straight-ticket voting to the state constitution, was approved 67-33.

References

External links
Candidates at Vote Smart 
Candidates at Ballotpedia
Campaign finance at OpenSecrets

 
Michigan
Michigan elections by year